Russell G. "Pete" Ashbaugh Jr. (May 23, 1921 – August 16, 2009) was an American football standout at the University of Notre Dame who went on to play for the Chicago Rockets in the late 1940s.

Ashbaugh gained early recognition as an All-City Gridder at Youngstown's South High School, in 1938, where he quarterbacked under his father, former Brown University gridder Busty Ashbaugh. He went on to play varsity football at Notre Dame both before and after World War II, distinguishing himself as a member of Fighting Irish national championship teams of 1946 and 1947. 

Ashbaugh's subsequent professional career with the Chicago Rockets was cut short by a knee injury. At the close of his sports career, he joined the Elkhart Brass Company, in Elkhart, Indiana, and eventually rose to the position of chief executive officer.

References

External links
 

1921 births
2009 deaths
American football quarterbacks
Notre Dame Fighting Irish football players
People from Elkhart, Indiana
Players of American football from Youngstown, Ohio